I Will Follow is a 2010 American independent drama film written and directed by Ava DuVernay, who also produced the film with Molly Mayeux. It stars Salli Richardson-Whitfield, Omari Hardwick, Blair Underwood and Beverly Todd.

Plot
Maye (Salli Richardson-Whitfield) is a successful artist who has taken a leave from work to care for her ill aunt, Amanda (Beverly Todd). As the film begins, Maye is moving out of the home she once shared with Amanda after her death and contemplating her relationships, her career, her past and her future.

Cast
 Salli Richardson-Whitfield as Maye
 Omari Hardwick as Troy
 Michole Briana White as Fran
 Dijan Talton as Raven
 Tracie Thoms as Tiffany
 Damone Roberts as Damone
 Blair Underwood as Evan
 Beverly Todd as Amanda
 Kiki Walls as Young Amanda
 Phalana Tiller as Christine
 Tony Perez as Tuliau
 Ramon Leon as Ramon
 Royale Watkins as Roy
 Owen H.M. Smith as Chuck
 Robert Silver as Benjamin 
 J.R. Ramirez as Percy
 Kiara Muhammad as Ronda, Fran's Daughter
 Scotty Noyd Jr. as Fran's Son
 Olivia Alvarado as Fran's Baby

Production
I Will Follow was shot in 11 days on location in Topanga Canyon, California, on a $50,000 budget. Its title was taken from the U2 song of the same name.

Release
I Will Follow made its world premiere in New York City at the 2010 Urbanworld Film Festival, where it won audience honors. It also played at the 2010 Chicago International Film Festival and the 2010 AFI Film Festival. The film had a limited release on March 11, 2011. Film critic Roger Ebert gave the film three and a half out of four stars.

Accolades

 African-American Film Critics Association
 2011, Best Screenplay: Ava DuVernay (Winner)
 Black Reel Awards
 2012, Best Screenplay: Ava DuVernay (Nominated)
 2012, Best Director: Ava DuVernay (Nominated)
 Image Awards
 2012, Outstanding Independent Motion Picture (Nominated)

See also
 List of black films of the 2010s

References

External links
 
 
 
 
 
 
 
 

2010 films
African-American drama films
Films directed by Ava DuVernay
2010 drama films
Films shot in California
2010s English-language films
2010s American films